Men of Wrath is a 5-issue comic written by Jason Aaron and drawn by Ron Garney.

External links

Icon Comics titles